The Holden Special Vehicles ClubSport, HSV ClubSport or “Clubby” is a Performance modified Full-Sized Sedan (and later, also station wagon) produced by Holden’s in-house tuning company Holden Special Vehicles based on the Holden Commodore, Introduced in 1989, the Clubsport would become HSVs mainstay entry level HSV model, The concept of the Clubsport is basically a Commodore SS, with a stylish bodykit, new (usually) Small Block V8, Customised interior, Exhaust kit, Lights and more, or less, depending on the series.

References 

HSV vehicles